Faras may refer to the following subjects:

Faras, city in Lower Nubia
Faras Cathedral, cathedral in the Lower Nubian
Faras Gallery at the National Museum in Warsaw, Polish art museum
Coptic Diocese of Faras, Coptic Orthodox Church diocese in Sudan
Rawdat Al Faras, village in Qatar
Khirbat Al Faras, Syrian city
Faras (name)

See also
Fara (disambiguation)